Events in the year 1721 in India.

Incumbents

Events
National income - ₹8,303 million
 April – October, the Attingal Outbreak took place
 13 and 14 November, the 1721 Madras cyclone struck Madras (now Chennai)
 Nazarbaug Palace, a Gaekwad palace built in Vadodara, Gujarat state
 December - Cricket was first played in India for Recreational purpose by English sailors in Cambay (now Khambhat), Gujarat.

Births

Deaths

References

 
Years of the 18th century in India